The smoothed octagon is a region in the plane found by Karl Reinhardt in 1934 and conjectured by him to have the lowest maximum packing density of the plane of all centrally symmetric convex shapes. It was also independently discovered by Kurt Mahler in 1947. It is constructed by replacing the corners of a regular octagon with a section of a hyperbola that is tangent to the two sides adjacent to the corner and asymptotic to the sides adjacent to these.

Construction

The shape of the smoothed octagon can be derived from its packings, which place octagons at the points of a triangular lattice. The requirement that these packings have the same density no matter how the lattice and smoothed octagon are rotated relative to each other, with shapes that remain in contact with each neighboring shape, can be used to determine the shape of the corners.  One of the figures shows three octagons that rotate while the area of the triangle formed by their centres remains constant, keeping them packed together as closely as possible.  For regular octagons, the red and blue shapes would overlap, so to enable the rotation to proceed the corners are clipped to a point that lies halfway between their centres, generating the required curve, which turns out to be a hyperbola.

The hyperbola is constructed tangent to two sides of the octagon, and asymptotic to the two adjacent to these. The following details apply to a regular octagon of circumradius  with its centre at the point  and one vertex at the point .

or the equivalent parameterization (for the right-hand branch only)

for the portion of the hyperbola that forms the corner, given by the range of parameter values

and the lines asymptotic to the hyperbola are simply .

Packing
The smoothed octagon has a maximum packing density given by

This is lower than the maximum packing density of circles, which is

The maximum known packing density of the ordinary regular octagon is

also slightly less than the maximum packing density of circles, but higher than that of the smoothed octagon.

The smoothed octagon achieves its maximum packing density, not just for a single packing, but for a 1-parameter family.  All of these are lattice packings. Reinhardt's conjecture that the smoothed octagon has the lowest maximum packing density of all centrally symmetric convex shapes in the plane remains unsolved. If central symmetry is not required, the regular heptagon has even lower packing density, but its optimality is also unproven.
In three dimensions, Ulam's packing conjecture states that no convex shape has a lower maximum packing density than the ball.

References

External links
The thinnest densest two-dimensional packing?. Peter Scholl, 2001.

Packing problems